This is a list of the butterflies of Sri Lanka. Of the 245 species, 24 are endemic to the island.

The list is in six parts:

List of butterflies of Sri Lanka (Pieridae)
List of butterflies of Sri Lanka (Papilionidae)
List of butterflies of Sri Lanka (Nymphalidae)
List of butterflies of Sri Lanka (Lycaenidae)
List of butterflies of Sri Lanka (Riodinidae)
List of butterflies of Sri Lanka (Hesperiidae)

Sri Lanka
Sri Lanka
Butterflies